"The Loves We Lost" first appeared in Tiësto's In Search of Sunrise 4: Latin America compilation. The song features samples from Paula Cole's song "She Can't Feel Anything Anymore". The song is performed by Allure, which is an alias of Tijs Verwest.

Formats and track listings

CD, Maxi Singles
United Kingdom Maxi Single
 "The Loves We Lost" (Original Mix)–8:55
 "The Loves We Lost" (Tilt Remix)–9:13
 "The Loves We Lost" (Original CD Version)–6:02

12" Vinyl
Magik Muzik, Ultra Records, Maelstrom Records 12" Vinyl
 "The Loves We Lost" –8:55
 "The Loves We Lost" (Tilt Remix)–9:13

Personnel
 Vocals: Paula Cole
 Writers: Tiësto & Paula Cole
 Samples from Paula Cole's song "She Can't Feel Anything Anymore".
 "The Loves We Lost (Tilt Remix)"
 Remixer(s): Andy Moor & Mick Park

Charts

Official versions
 Original Mix (8:55)
 Tilt Remix (9:13)
 Original CD Version (6:02)

Release history

References

Tiësto songs
2006 songs
Songs written by Tiësto